Kalateh-ye Kolukh (also Romanized as Kalāteh-ye Kolūkh; also known as Aḩmadābād) is a village in Howmeh Rural District, in the Central District of Gonabad County, Razavi Khorasan Province, Iran. At the 2006 census, its population was 121, in 34 families.

References 

Populated places in Gonabad County